Cyril III may refer to:

 Pope Cyril III of Alexandria, ruled in 1235–1243
 Cyril III of Alexandria, Greek Patriarch of Alexandria in 1601–20
 Cyril III of Constantinople, Ecumenical Patriarch in 1652 and 1654